Edmond Laurent Etling (before 1909 – around 1940) was a French art dealer, gallery owner, designer, and a manufacturer of high-quality decorative objects made of bronze, ceramics and art glass in the Art Deco style.  

He owned La Societe Anonyme Edmond Etling (English: Edmond Etling Limited Company) for manufacturing, his foundry was named Edmond Etling & Cie, and sometimes the products are referred to as "Etling Glass". His gallery, Galerie Béranger was located Paris (however there are discrepancies on the exact address).

Biography 

His company La Societe Anonyme Edmond Etling, founded in Paris in 1909, manufactured decorative object and commissioned sculptors and artists, including Georges Béal, Demétre Chiparus, Claire Colinet, Armand Godard, Geneviève Granger, Marcel Guillard, Maurice Guiraud-Rivière, Géza Hiecz, Fanny Rozet, and Lucille Sévin. Other artists worked with Etling when casting their statuettes including Aurore Onu, Marcel Bouraine, Pierre Le Faguays, Raymonde Guerbe, and André Vincent Becquerel.

Etling is known for light blue opalescent objects such as plates and bowls, which were also produced in gray and frosted glass. Most items bore the cast signature "Etling France" followed by a model number related to the Choisy-le-Roi catalogue. 

In 1910, Etling was awarded the diplome d'honneur at Brussels International (1910). In 1923, he was awarded the Grand Prix in Paris. In 1940, Etling closed his shop due to World War II. Because Etling was of Jewish descent, he was send to a Nazi concentration camp where he died.

In the 1970s, the Manufacture Royale de Porcelaine de Sèvres reproduced some Etling designs, particularly the female nudes.

See also 

 Art Deco in Paris
 International Exhibition of Modern Decorative and Industrial Arts
 Paris between the Wars (1919–1939)
 Joh. Loetz Witwe, art glass manufacturer
 Lalique

References

External links 
 Projet Etling / Etling Project, Glass of La Societe Anonyme Edmond Etling

Date of birth missing
Date of death unknown
French people executed in Nazi concentration camps
French art dealers
French brands
Glassmaking companies of France
Design companies established in 1909
French Jews who died in the Holocaust
20th-century French Jews